The Ağrı Challenger was a professional tennis tournament played on outdoor hard courts. It was part of the ATP Challenger Tour, and its only edition was held in October 2015.

Past finals

Singles

Doubles

External links
 ITF Archive

 
ATP Challenger Tour
Hard court tennis tournaments
Tennis tournaments in Turkey